Crimson Trace is an American manufacturer of laser sight equipment, chiefly but not exclusively for pistols. The firm specializes in in-line upper-grip-mounted red and green laser units, trigger-guard mounted sights, and training units. Crimson Trace partners with manufacturers of firearms in product releases, with many models shipping with Crimson Trace lasers preinstalled.

In August 2016, Smith & Wesson purchased Crimson Trace for $95 million.  The company was previously owned by Crimson Trace Holdings, backed by Peninsula Capital Partners and Lake Oswego-based VergePointe Capital.

References

Optics manufacturing companies
Companies based in Wilsonville, Oregon
1994 establishments in Oregon
American companies established in 1994